Chen Weihong (born 1970) is a Chinese retired para table tennis player. She won three gold medals and a silver from the 2000 and 2004 Summer Paralympics.

She is a polio survivor.

References

1970 births
Living people
Table tennis players at the 2000 Summer Paralympics
Table tennis players at the 2004 Summer Paralympics
Paralympic medalists in table tennis
Medalists at the 2000 Summer Paralympics
Medalists at the 2004 Summer Paralympics
Chinese female table tennis players
Paralympic gold medalists for China
Paralympic silver medalists for China
Paralympic table tennis players of China
Table tennis players from Hunan
People from Zhuzhou
People with polio
FESPIC Games competitors